, usually shortened to "Ichimoku", is a technical analysis method that builds on candlestick charting to improve the accuracy of forecast price moves.

History 

He spent 30 years perfecting the technique before releasing his findings to the general public in the late 1960s.

Ichimoku Kinko Hyo translates to one glance equilibrium chart or instant look at the balance chart and is sometimes referred to as "one glance cloud chart" based on the unique "clouds" that feature in Ichimoku charting.

Ichimoku is a moving average-based trend identification system and because it contains more data points than standard candlestick charts, it provides a clearer picture of potential price action. The main difference between how moving averages are plotted in Ichimoku as opposed to other methods is that Ichimoku's lines are constructed using the 50% point of the highs and lows as opposed to the candle's closing price. Ichimoku takes into consideration the factor of time as an additional element along with the price action, similar to William Delbert Gann's trading ideas.

In the Western world, it is solely known for its “Graphic Environment”, due to the fact that authors have not translated the original manual into English, German, nor Spanish. However, Ichimoku is also integrated by three other theories that improve and enhance the indicator:

 Time Theory 
 Wave Movement Theory 
 Target Price Theory

Key Elements of Ichimoku's Graphic Environment

Tenkan-sen
Tenkan-sen calculation: (highest high + lowest low)/2 for the last 9 periods.

Also called the conversion line (blue line), it is primarily used as a signal line and a minor support/resistance line. This is the turning line and is derived by averaging the highest high and the lowest low for the past nine periods. The Tenkan Sen is an indicator of the market trend. If the blue line is moving up or down, it indicates that the market is trending. If it moves horizontally, it signals that the market is ranging.

Kijun-sen
Kijun-sen calculation: (highest high + lowest low)/2 for the past 26 periods.

Also called the base line (red line), this is a confirmation line, a support/resistance line, and can be used as a trailing stop line. The Kijun Sen acts as an indicator of future price movement. If the price is higher than the blue line, it could continue to climb higher. If the price is below the blue line, it could keep dropping.

Senkou span A
Senkou span A calculation: (Tenkan-sen + kijun-sen)/2 plotted 26 periods ahead.

Also called leading span 1, this line forms one edge of the kumo or cloud.

If the price is above the Senkou span, the top line serves as the first support level while the bottom line serves as the second support level.

If the price is below the Senkou span, the bottom line forms the first resistance level while the top line is the second resistance level.

Senkou span B
Senkou span B calculation: (highest high + lowest low)/2 calculated over the past 52 time periods and plotted 26 periods ahead.

Also called leading span 2, this line forms the other edge of the Kumo.

Kumo
Kumo (cloud) is the space between Senkou span A and B. The cloud edges identify current and potential future support and resistance points.

The Kumo cloud changes in shape and height based on price changes. This height represents volatility as larger price movements form thicker clouds, which creates stronger support and resistance. As thinner clouds offer only weak support and resistance, prices can and tend to break through such thin clouds.

Generally, markets are bullish when Senkou Span A is above Senkou Span B and vice versa when markets are bearish. Traders often look for Kumo Twists in future clouds, where Senkou Span A and B exchange positions, a signal of potential trend reversals.

In addition to thickness, the strength of the cloud can also be ascertained by its angle; upwards for bullish and downwards for bearish. Any clouds behind price are also known as Kumo Shadows.

Chikou span
Chikou span calculation: today's closing price projected back 26 days on the chart.

Also called the lagging span it is used as a support/resistance aid.

If the Chikou Span or the green line crosses the price in the bottom-up direction, that is a buy signal. If the green line crosses the price from the top-down, that is a sell signal.

References

Further reading 
 Trading with Ichimoku Clouds: The Essential Guide to Ichimoku Kinko Hyo Technical Analysis, Hoboken, New Jersey: Wiley Trading. 
Ichimoku Charts: An Introduction to Ichimoku Kinko Clouds, Hampshire, Great Britain: Harriman House. 
Ichimoku Cloud, Fidelity.

Chart overlays
1960s introductions
1960s establishments in Japan
Japanese inventions
Market indicators
Technical indicators